Synonyms is a 2019 international co-produced drama film directed by Nadav Lapid, from a screenplay by Lapid and Haim Lapid. It stars Tom Mercier, Quentin Dolmaire and Louise Chevillotte. It had its world premiere at the Berlin International Film Festival on 13 February 2019, where it won the Golden Bear, and the FIPRESCI Award (Competition). It was released in Israel on 28 February 2019, in France on 27 March 2019, by SBS Distribution and in Germany on 5 September 2019, by Grand Film. The film received positive reviews from critics.

Plot
A young Israeli man absconds to Paris to flee his nationality.

Cast
 Tom Mercier as Yoav
 Quentin Dolmaire as Emile
  as Caroline
 Uria Hayik as Yaron
  as Michel
 Léa Drucker as French Teacher

Release
The film had its world premiere at the Berlin International Film Festival on 13 February 2019. The film was released in Israel on 28 February 2019. It was released in France on 27 March 2019, by SBS Distribution. In May 2019, Kino Lorber acquired U.S. distribution rights to the film. It was released in Germany on 5 September 2019, by Grand Film.

The film also screened at the Toronto International Film Festival on 9 September 2019. and the New York Film Festival on 29 September 2019. It was released in the United States on 25 October 2019.

Critical reception
Synonyms received positive reviews from film critics. The site's critical consensus reads, "Synonyms latches onto third-rail issues with thrilling audacity -- and taps into an energy that proves as discomfiting as it is infectious." On Metacritic, the film holds a rating of 84 out of 100, based on 21 critics, indicating "universal acclaim".

References

External links
 
Synonymes in the Berlinale 2019 documentation

2019 films
2019 drama films
2019 multilingual films
French drama films
2010s French-language films
Israeli drama films
German drama films
2010s Hebrew-language films
Golden Bear winners
French multilingual films
Israeli multilingual films
German multilingual films
Films directed by Nadav Lapid
2010s French films
2010s German films